Tricholomopsis ornata is a species of Tricholomopsis from Europe.

Gallery

References

External links
 
 

ornata